Paul J. Lawless (born July 2, 1964) is a Canadian former professional ice hockey left winger who played seven seasons in the National Hockey League (NHL) as a member of the Hartford Whalers, Philadelphia Flyers, Vancouver Canucks and Toronto Maple Leafs.

Early life
Lawless was born in Scarborough, Ontario and raised in Toronto, Ontario. As a youth, he played in the 1977 Quebec International Pee-Wee Hockey Tournament with a minor ice hockey team from Toronto. He attended the Cedarbrae Collegiate Institute in Scarborough.

Playing career
Lawless began his NHL career with the Hartford Whalers in 1984. He also played for the Philadelphia Flyers, Vancouver Canucks and Toronto Maple Leafs. He left the NHL after the 1989 season. He played several more years in the minor leagues and in Europe before retiring following the 1999 season. Paul played some of his junior hockey with George Finn, who starred as Carl Racki in the 1986 film Youngblood.

Awards

Hartford/Carolina records
Most points in one game (6 vs. Toronto on Jan. 4, 1987, shares record)

IHL
1992–93: Cincinnati MVP
1993–94: IHL All-Star Second Team: (Cincinnati)
Cincinnati Most career game-winning goals (22)
Cincinnati Most career hat tricks (5)

Other
1983–84: OHL All-Star Second Team (Windsor)
1983–84: OHL All-Star Game (Windsor)
1983–84: Windsor Molson Cup (Three-Stars Leader)
1984–85: Salt Lake "Mr. Hustle" Award

Career statistics

Coaching record

References

External links
 

1964 births
Austin Ice Bats (WPHL) players
Binghamton Whalers players
Canadian ice hockey left wingers
Cincinnati Cyclones (IHL) players
EC Graz players
Hartford Whalers draft picks
Hartford Whalers players
HC Davos players
Living people
Milwaukee Admirals (IHL) players
National Hockey League first-round draft picks
New Haven Senators players
Newmarket Saints players
Philadelphia Flyers players
Salt Lake Golden Eagles (IHL) players
Sportspeople from Scarborough, Toronto
Ice hockey people from Toronto
Toronto Maple Leafs players
Vancouver Canucks players
Windsor Spitfires players
Canadian expatriate ice hockey players in Austria
Canadian expatriate ice hockey players in Switzerland
Canadian expatriate ice hockey players in the United States